Slávnosť úprimných slov is a five-track Slovak EP of Christmas compositions by Marika Gombitová, Václav Patejdl, Ján Lehotský, and Richard Müller. The compilation was issued on OPUS in 1987.

Track listing

Personnel
 Marika Gombitová – lead vocals, songwriting
 Václav Patejdl – lead vocals, songwriting
 Ján Lehotský – lead vocals, songwriting
 Richard Müller – lead vocals
 Children's Choir of Czechoslovak Radio – backing vocals
 Július Kinček – producer

References

General
 
 
 
Specific

External links
 

1987 debut EPs
Marika Gombitová EPs